The Hincaster branch  was a single-track railway branch line of the Furness Railway which ran from  on the Furness main line to a junction with the Lancaster and Carlisle Railway (later the London and North Western Railway) at Hincaster.

Traffic

Closure
The passenger service ended on 4 May 1942 and the track between Sandside and Hincaster Junction was lifted in 1966 (through traffic having ceased three years earlier).  A short stub from Arnside to Sandside lasted until 1972 to serve local quarries.

Sections of the old trackbed survive and are used as a footpath and cycleway, though the viaduct and both intermediate stations have been demolished.

Ownership

Notes

References

 Conolly, W.P. [1958](1997) British Railways Pre-Grouping Atlas and Gazetteer, 5th Ed., Shepperton: Ian Allan, .
 Marshall, J (1981) Forgotten Railways - North-West England, David & Charles (Publishers) Ltd, Newton Abbott, .

External links
 Railscot - Hincaster Branch
 photo of train on Bela Viaduct about 1949
 photo of Bela Viaduct from Haverbrack Hill

Closed railway lines in North East England
Railway lines opened in 1876
Rail transport in Cumbria
1876 establishments in England